Gordonia speciosa is a species of plant in the family Theaceae. It is endemic to Sri Lanka. It is red in color which gives it the name 'rathu mihiriya' which is Sinhala for 'red beauty'. It has oval shaped leaves. Gordonia speciosa is at high risk of extinction, being found in just one location which holds fewer than one hundred individual trees. This species was once more common in forests above Ramboda in Sri Lanka but has undergone severe population declines.

Uses
Ornamental; Bark - medicinal; Wood - light construction.

Culture
It is known as "රතු මිහිරිය - rathu mihiriya" in Sinhala.

References

Sources
 plantlist
 Info
 Data

Endemic flora of Sri Lanka
speciosa